Sedina Hakki is a 1985 Kannada-language film, directed by Dorai–Bhagavan, based on the novel of the same name by T. K. Rama Rao. The film stars Ananth Nag and Lakshmi. This was the last film where both paired with each other This was touted to be the 1000th movie of Kannada film industry, but ultimately lost to Devarelliddane.

The film's score and songs were composed by Rajan–Nagendra.

Cast 
 Ananth Nag
 Lakshmi
 Tiger Prabhakar
 Jayamalini
 Dinesh
 Rajeev
 Kaminidharan
 Lakshman
 Thimmaiah
 Shanthamma

Soundtrack 
The music was composed by Rajan–Nagendra duo, with lyrics by R. N. Jayagopal.

References

External links 
 

1985 films
1980s Kannada-language films
Indian drama films
Films based on Indian novels
Films scored by Rajan–Nagendra
Films directed by Dorai–Bhagavan